is a Japanese politician serving in the House of Representatives in the Diet (national legislature) as a member of the Liberal Democratic Party.

Career
A native of Minamikawachi District, Osaka and graduate of the University of Kyoto Faculty of Law and Graduate School of University of California at Berkeley, Takemoto was elected for the first time in 1996. He started his career as a civil servant in the former National Land Agency (now Ministry of Land, Infrastructure, Transport and Tourism). Since his election to the Diet he has also served as Parliamentary Secretary for Economy, Trade and Industry (Mori Cabinet), Parliamentary Secretary for Health, Labour and Welfare (Koizumi Cabinet), and Senior Vice-Minister of Finance (Koizumi Cabinet).

In June 2010, Takemoto became the Chairperson of the National Public Safety Commission and Minister of Economy and Fiscal) at the Tanigaki Shadow Cabinet.

He became State Minister in charge of Science and Technology Policy on September 11, 2019.

Positions
Affiliated to the openly revisionist lobby Nippon Kaigi, Takemoto is a member of the following right-wing groups in the Diet:
Nippon Kaigi Diet discussion group (日本会議国会議員懇談会 - Nippon kaigi kokkai giin kondankai)
Conference of parliamentarians on the Shinto Association of Spiritual Leadership (神道政治連盟国会議員懇談会 - Shinto Seiji Renmei Kokkai Giin Kondankai) - NB: SAS a.k.a. Sinseiren, Shinto Political League

Takemoto gave the following answers to the questionnaire submitted by Mainichi to parliamentarians in 2012:
in favor of the revision of the Constitution
in favor of the right of collective self-defense (revision of Article 9)
against the reform of the National assembly (unicameral instead of bicameral)
in favor of reactivating nuclear power plants
against the goal of zero nuclear power by 2030s
in favor of the relocation of Marine Corps Air Station Futenma (Okinawa)
not applicable: evaluating the purchase of Senkaku Islands by the Government
not applicable: a strong attitude versus China
not applicable: the participation of Japan to the Trans-Pacific Partnership
against a nuclear-armed Japan
against the reform of the Imperial Household that would allow women to retain their Imperial status even after marriage

References

External links
 Official website in Japanese.

Living people
1940 births
Liberal Democratic Party (Japan) politicians
Members of Nippon Kaigi
Members of the House of Representatives (Japan)
Kyoto University alumni
21st-century Japanese politicians